Lorillard v. Reilly, 533 U.S. 525 (2001), was a 2001 case brought by Lorillard Tobacco Company when Massachusetts instituted a ban on tobacco ads and sales of tobacco within 1,000 feet (300 m) of schools and playgrounds.  Lorillard argued that this was an infringement on its First Amendment rights and that the regulation was more extensive than necessary.  Applying the Central Hudson Test, the U.S. Supreme Court held that  Massachusetts' ban on advertising and tobacco sales was overbroad.  The Supreme Court also held that the Massachusetts regulation was preempted by federal law.

See also
Commercial speech
Bigelow v. Commonwealth of Virginia, 421 U.S. 809 (1974)
Bates v. State Bar of Arizona, 433 U.S. 350 (1977)
Linmark Associates, Inc., v. Township of Willingboro, 431 U.S. 85 (1977)
Central Hudson Gas & Electric Corp. v. Public Service Commission, 447 U.S. 557 (1980)
Posadas de Puerto Rico Associates v. Tourism Company of Puerto Rico, 478 U.S. 328 (1986)
List of United States Supreme Court cases
List of United States Supreme Court cases, volume 533

External links

United States Supreme Court cases
United States Supreme Court cases of the Rehnquist Court
United States Free Speech Clause case law
United States commercial speech case law
2001 in United States case law
United States tobacco case law
Lorillard Tobacco Company
Smoking in the United States